The Cairo Luna Park was a trolley park in Heliopolis, Egypt. Open from 1911 to the beginning of 1915, the Cairo Luna Park was the first Western-style amusement park in Africa and the first in the Middle East. On 19 January 1915, buildings and grounds were converted into an auxiliary hospital at Luna Park for World War I; the hospital was closed on 10 July 1916.

The amusement park
Heliopolis, designed to be an "oasis" of Cairo, was built in the first decade of the 20th century. After a 1907 stock market crash, the city's developers contracted with the Egyptian government to build housing for government workers; in addition, entertainment venues for the new arrivals were also planned, turning Heliopolis into Egypt's first entertainment zone. In addition to a hippodrome, polo field, cricket field, aerodrome, golf course, restaurants, and a new tram from Cairo, a new amusement park - Luna Park, the first amusement park in Africa and the first in the Middle East - was built around 1910. Opened to the public for the first time on 16 June 1911, Luna Park offered mechanical rides (including a switchback roller coaster), a midway, a skating rink, and restaurants.

The auxiliary hospital for convalescent patients
The onset of World War I in late 1914 led to the formation of the Australian and New Zealand Army Corps (ANZACS) under General William Birdwood in Egypt. One of its first acts is the establishment of No. 1 Australian General Hospital in the Heliopolis Palace Hotel just outside Luna Park by 19 January 1915. Demand for bedspace increased to the point that the ANZACS expanded the medical facilities, first to Luna Park's ice skating rink by establishing an auxiliary branch of No. 1 AGH; by 28 April 1915, over 500 beds filled the rink, and further accommodations were provided in makeshift-fashion in the haunted house, the round about, the scenic railroad, and the pavilion; the ticket office was modified to contain an operating theatre. By middle of May 1915, the hospital was treating casualties from Gallipoli; at this point, Luna Park contained over 1200 beds, many constructed of bamboo and palm wood, each bed with its own "customer". No. 1 AGH created additional auxiliary branches of its hospital nearby. By August 1915, the number of wounded at Luna Park reached 1400. Ultimately, this auxiliary branch of 1AGH closed on 10 July 1916, when the main hospital moved to France.
This auxiliary should not be confused with the real No. 1 Australian Auxiliary Hospital which opened at Harefield, England in March 1915.

After World War I

 now occupies the former site of Luna Park. While many of the buildings that rimmed the park remain, no traces of the once-popular tourist attraction exist.

References

Defunct amusement parks
History of Cairo
Buildings and structures in Cairo
Military installations of Australia
Military installations of New Zealand
New Zealand in World War I
Military history of Australia during World War I
Military installations of Egypt
World War I sites in Egypt